Anjali Nair is an Indian actress and model who predominantly works in Malayalam film industry. She is a recipient of the Kerala State Film Award for Best Character Actress at Kerala State film Awards in 2015.

Early and personal life
She began her career as a child artist in Manathe Vellitheru.

Anjali married Aneesh Upasana, but they separated. She has a daughter Aavni, who acted as her daughter in 5 Sundarikal.

Career
Anjali started off as a model, before working as a television anchor and acting in more than one hundred advertisements. She then acted in many music albums, including La Cochin by Vineeth Sreenivasan. She has featured in a television serial titled "Bandhangal Bandhanangal" and appeared in many television shows.

Filmography

Feature films

Short films

Television

References

External links 

 
 
 

Living people
Indian film actresses
Actresses in Malayalam cinema
Actresses in Tamil cinema
Kerala State Film Award winners
20th-century Indian actresses
21st-century Indian actresses
Year of birth missing (living people)
Actresses in Malayalam television